Night Sky is a discontinued American bimonthly magazine for entry-level stargazers.  It was published between May/June 2004 and March/April 2007 by Sky Publishing, which also produces Sky & Telescope (S&T).

Night Sky was intended to be a less technical than S&T.  The target audience was recreational naked-eye and low-power instrument observers.  The magazine was discontinued because of low sales, and subscriptions were converted to an equal number of issues of S&T.

References

Amateur astronomy
Bimonthly magazines published in the United States
Astronomy magazines
Defunct magazines published in the United States
Magazines established in 2004
Magazines disestablished in 2007
Science and technology magazines published in the United States